The Orange Girl (Appelsinpiken) is a Norwegian film released in February 2009. It is based on a book by author Jostein Gaarder; a book translated to 43 languages. In addition to the Norwegian production company Sandrew Metronome, the German company Tradewind Pictures and the Spanish Jaleo Films are also part of the project.

Plot

The film is based on a 2003 novel by the same name, written by Norwegian author Jostein Gaarder. The main character is the young boy Georg who one day finds a long letter from his deceased father in his old red stroller. The letter tells, among other things, about the father's youthful love for the mysterious "orange girl" (appelsinpiken), and leaves a mystery for Georg to solve. The story leaps back and forth between the father's letters to the future, the young boy's thoughts and the events of the father's life.

Reception
The newspaper Verdens Gang gave the film four out of six points. The reviewer, Jon Selås, found the film had succeeded in tying together several different story lines in a convincing manner. At the same time he did not think the flow of the dialogue was entirely natural. Among the actors he was most impressed by Annie Dahr Nygaard's effort.

References

External links
 

2009 films
2009 drama films
2000s Norwegian-language films
Films directed by Eva Dahr
Norwegian drama films